Starns also known as Starns Mill is an unincorporated community in Livingston Parish, Louisiana, United States.

History
A post office was established here in April 1882 and the area was named after the first postmaster, Adolphus Starns. Adolphus was a descendant of Edward Bynum Starns, who received the first land grant given in the area by the Spanish Empire. The Morgan family stated in an interview that a man named Sentel Lott would carry the daily mail back and forth between Holden, Louisiana, using a mule and buggy.

References

Unincorporated communities in Livingston Parish, Louisiana
Unincorporated communities in Louisiana